Połowce  is a village in the administrative district of Gmina Czeremcha, within Hajnówka County, Podlaskie Voivodeship, in north-eastern Poland, close to the border with Belarus.

The village has a population of 18.

References

Villages in Hajnówka County
Belarus–Poland border crossings